Ayisat Yusuf-Aromire (born 6 March 1985) is a retired Nigerian female football player, who now lives in Finland.

Yusuf played for several clubs in Nigeria and Finland. She was a member of the Nigerian squad at the 2004 African Women's Championship, 2007 Women's World Cup and the 2008 Summer Olympics.

Yusuf lives in Kannelmäki, Helsinki. She married a Nigerian man and they have two children born in Finland.

Sources 
UrheiluSuomi.com

References 

1985 births
Nigerian women's footballers
Nigeria women's international footballers
2007 FIFA Women's World Cup players
Footballers at the 2008 Summer Olympics
Olympic footballers of Nigeria
NiceFutis players
Living people
Women's association football defenders
Delta Queens F.C. players
Nasarawa Amazons F.C. players
Rivers Angels F.C. players
Osun Babes F.C. players